Gunnison River Bridge I and Gunnison River Bridge II are two  long bridges built during 1926–27.  They were separately listed on the National Register of Historic Places in 2002.

The bridges carry what is now the U.S. Highway 50 service road.  Bridge I brings it over Gunnison River overflow at mileposts 155.41 and Bridge II, at 155.59, brings it over the Gunnison River proper.

Their trusses were fabricated by the American Bridge Company.

See also
National Register of Historic Places listings in Gunnison County, Colorado

References

Bridges on the National Register of Historic Places in Colorado
National Register of Historic Places in Gunnison County, Colorado